Nicolaus Christian Friis  (1 February 1714 – 22 May 1777) was a Norwegian priest and theologian.

Niels or Nicolai Friis was born at Lille-Fosen (now Kristiansund) in Møre og Romsdal, Norway. Friis attended the Trondheim Cathedral School and graduated with a degree in theology from the University of Copenhagen in 1736. In 1737, he was appointed assistant pastor at Alstahaug.

In 1744 he was appointed parish priest at Bodin Church in Nordland, Norway. The following year, he married Sophie à Möinichen Randulf (1693–1779), the widow of bailiff Søren Randulf who had died 1743.  In 1754 he was assigned the position of  Titular Bishop of the Diocese of Nidaros in Trondheim, a title for which he paid 8,000 riksdaler to achieve.  In 1771, Friis received the office of senior priest  (sogneprest)  at Korskirken in Bergen which he held until he was granted leave of retirement in 1774. From the 1770s he published several scientific works on the fisheries in Northern Norway. The life of Friis is treated by several biographers. He died in Bergen in 1777.

Selected works
  Illustration til Bispevisitatserne i Nordland og Finmarken - 1771

References

Related reading
 Eilertsen, Turid Følling (1990) Bodin kirke 750 år: «hvor elskelig dine boliger er … (Bodø: Bodin menighetsråd) 

1714 births
1777 deaths
People from Kristiansund
People educated at the Trondheim Cathedral School
University of Copenhagen alumni
18th-century Norwegian Lutheran clergy
Norwegian Lutheran bishops
Norwegian male writers